Computer Ambush is a 1980 video game published by Strategic Simulations.

Gameplay
Computer Ambush is a game in which the player controls 10 soldiers in man-to-man combat in World War II.

Reception
David Long reviewed the game for Computer Gaming World, stating that: "Computer Ambush (Second Edition) has been well worth the wait! It's fast, smooth flowing, and surprisingly realistic. This game could set the standard for tactical simulations for a long time to come. At least, until the Third Edition comes out."

Reviews
Computer Gaming World -  Nov, 1991
Casus Belli #8 (April 1982)
Moves #57, p13

References

External links
Review in Creative Computing
Review in Creative Computing
Review in Electronic Games
Review in Antic
Review in Atari Explorer
Entry in "Things To Do With Your Atari Computer"
Article in Video Games

1980 video games
Apple II games
Atari 8-bit family games
Strategic Simulations games